John Martin Kolinski (born 1984) is a US-American engineer. He is a professor at EPFL (École Polytechnique Fédérale de Lausanne) and the head of the Laboratory of Engineering Mechanics of Soft Interfaces (EMSI) at EPFL's School of Engineering.

Career 
Kolinski studied both engineering mechanics and mathematics at the University of Illinois at Urbana–Champaign and graduated with Bachelor's degrees in both subjects in 2008, before earning a Master's degree in applied mathematics (Sc.M.) and a PhD in applied physics from Harvard University, in 2010 and 2013, respectively. His PhD thesis on "The role of air in droplet impact on a smooth, solid surface" was supervised by Lakshminarayanan Mahadevan and Shmuel Rubinstein. Supported by a Fulbright-Israel post-doctoral fellowship, he moved in 2014 to Israel to work with Eran Sharon and Jay Fineberg at the Racah Institute of Physics at the Hebrew University of Jerusalem. There he studied the inter-facial instabilities in fluid and solid systems such as water bells and the fracture of hydrogels.

Since May 2017, Kolinski has been a Tenure Track Assistant Professor at EPFL and the head of the Laboratory of Engineering Mechanics of Soft Interfaces (EMSI) at EPFL's School of Engineering.

Research 
Kolinski's research is invested into interfacial mechanics such as the understanding how objects break (fracture mechanics), and how wet objects dry and how dry objects wet (capillary phenomena at complex interfaces). For the study of theses phenomena he adapts and develops new experimental methods, such as the virtual frame technique.

While at his laboratory, his former student Wassim Dhaouadi solved a long-standing problem in physics, the Bretherton's buoyant bubble. Dhaouadi was awarded the EPFL award (2018) and was named one of JCI 10 outstanding persons of the year.

His research has been covered in news outlets such as New Atlas, Technology Review, Science Daily, Phys.org, SciTechDaily.

Distinctions 
Kolinski is a member of the American Physical Society, the Society for Experimental Mechanics, The Society for Engineering Science, The Optical Society, and European Mechanics Society (Euromech).

Selected works

References

External links 
 
 Website of the Laboratory of Engineering Mechanics of Soft Interfaces

Living people
Harvard University alumni
Hebrew University of Jerusalem alumni
1984 births
Grainger College of Engineering alumni
Academic staff of the École Polytechnique Fédérale de Lausanne
American scientists